ShadowMachine is an American animation studio and production company for film, television, commercials and music videos.

Since its early days producing the stop-motion animation show Robot Chicken, the company has been producing such shows as Moral Orel, Mary Shelley's Frankenhole and Titan Maximum for Cartoon Network’s Adult Swim. Afterwards, the company produced BoJack Horseman, for Michael Eisner's Tornante Company, starring Will Arnett, Aaron Paul, and Amy Sedaris, as well as Tuca & Bertie, starring Tiffany Haddish, Ali Wong, and Steven Yeun.

Films

Television

Specials

Music videos

Advertising 
As the studio has grown, they have also taken on work with various advertising campaigns with high-profile clients such as Honda. It was also honored at the ADDY Awards for an ad campaign with Farmers Insurance, directed by Jed Hathaway.

 Pinto Promos for Fuel TV
 Hallmark eCards (Can't Touch This)
 Director: Rohitash Rao
 Happy Honda Days Shorts for Honda with Secret Weapon (2012)
 Director: Jed Hathaway
 Snow White for Disney
 Lake Nona for GE with BBH L.A
 Verrado for Cecillian Worldwide
 Director: Rohitash Rao
 Boost Mobile Don't Data & Drive for Boost Mobile with 180LA
 Director: Rohitash Rao
 ENOS for Comedy Central Super Bowl Special
 Pinto for Fuel TV
 Happy Honda Days Shorts for Honda with Secret Weapon (2013)
 Director: Jed Hathaway
 Red Velvet Oreo for Nabisco with 360i
 Director/Producer: Jed Hathaway
 Glide for Oral-B with Publicis
 Director: Rohitash Rao
 Farmers for Farmer’s Insurance with RPA
 Centaur and the Late Night Munchie Meal for Jack In The Box with Secret Weapon
 Director: Jed Hathaway
 Fire House Subs for Fire House Subs with 360i (New York)
 Director/Producer: Jed Hathaway
 Happy Honda Days Shorts for Honda with Secret Weapon (2014)
 Director: Jed Hathaway
 The Work Revolution for Freelancer’s Union
 Director: Rohitash Rao
 Boost Mobile ZTE Warp Sync for Boost Mobile with 180LA
 Director: Rohitash Rao
 Omakase for Cartoon Network/Adult Swim with Cutaway Creative
 Director: Jesse Selwyn
 Smores Oreo for Nabisco with 360i
 Director/Producer: Jed Hathaway
 Happy Honda Days Shorts for Honda with Secret Weapon (2015)
 Director: Jed Hathaway
 Subway for Subway with 360i (New York)
 Director: Jed Hathaway
 Oreo for Nabisco with 360i
 Director: Ben Bjelejac
 Red Nose for Walgreens and BuzzFeed
 Director: Michael Langan
 Trolls for M.A.C.
 Director: Tony Kelly
 A Christmas Carol for NBC Sports - SNF
 Director: Jed Hathaway
 Nissan Star Wars
 Director: Tony Stacchi
 Go Deeper for Newport Beach Film Festival
 Director: Jed Hathaway

Awards

Film

Television
The studio has received a high level of recognition for their work in Television, including multiple Emmy and Annie Awards on behalf of the Academy of Television Arts & Sciences and ASIFA-Hollywood, respectively.

References

External links 
 
 ShadowMachine on StudioSystem

Mass media companies established in 1999
Film production companies of the United States
Television production companies of the United States
American animation studios
Adult animation studios
American companies established in 1999